Zonulin (haptoglobin 2 precursor) is a protein that increases the permeability of tight junctions between cells of the wall of the digestive tract. It was discovered in 2000 by Alessio Fasano and his team at the University of Maryland School of Medicine. As the mammalian analogue of zonula occludens toxin, secreted by cholera pathogen Vibrio cholerae, zonulin has been implicated in the pathogenesis of coeliac disease and diabetes mellitus type 1. Type 2 diabetic patients have shown increased zonulin. 

Gliadin (a glycoprotein present in gluten) activates zonulin signaling irrespective of the genetic expression of autoimmunity, leading to increased intestinal permeability of macromolecules.

Zonula occludens toxin is being studied as an adjuvant to improve absorption of drugs and vaccines. In 2014 a zonulin receptor antagonist, larazotide acetate (formerly known as AT-1001), completed a phase 2b clinical trial.

See also
Leaky gut syndrome

References

Digestive system